Delias zebuda is a butterfly in the family Pieridae. It was described by William Chapman Hewitson in 1862. It is found in the Australasian realm (Celebes, Ternate, Menado).

References

External links
Delias at Markku Savela's Lepidoptera and Some Other Life Forms

zebuda 
Butterflies described in 1862